The discography for American country music artist Roger Miller consists of 52 singles and 19 studio albums. Miller released singles between 1957 and 1986, charting two number 1 singles on Hot Country Songs and nine additional Top 10 hits.

Studio albums

1960s

1970s

1980s and 1990s

Compilation albums

1960s and 1970s

1990s

2000s

Live albums

Singles

1950s and 1960s

1970s and 1980s

Charted B-sides

References

Miller, Roger
Discographies of American artists